Yusuf Yılmaz (born 30 January 1991) is a German footballer with Turkish descent who last played professionally in Germany for FSV Frankfurt II. He has previously played in Greece for Ethnikos Piraeus in 2009-2010. He has previously played for English club Stoke City in their youth Academy as well as his hometown club Hannover 96.

Personal life
Yusuf is the younger brother of Fatih Yılmaz and both hold a German passport.

References

1991 births
Living people
German people of Turkish descent
Turkish footballers
German footballers
Hannover 96 players
Stoke City F.C. players
Ethnikos Piraeus F.C. players
FSV Frankfurt players
Turkish expatriate sportspeople in Greece

Association football midfielders
Footballers from Hanover